Jamie Holmes may refer to:

Jamie Holmes (author) (born 1980) American author
Jamie Holmes (cricketer) (born 1992), Irish cricketer
Jamie Holmes (soccer) (born 1983), American professional soccer player
Jamie Holmes (tennis) (born 1973), Australian professional tennis player